Insidious: The Last Key is a 2018 American supernatural horror film directed by Adam Robitel and written by Leigh Whannell. It is produced by Jason Blum, Oren Peli, and James Wan. It is the fourth installment in the Insidious franchise, and the second in the chronology of the story running through the series. Starring Lin Shaye, Angus Sampson, Leigh Whannell, Spencer Locke, Caitlin Gerard, and Bruce Davison, the film follows parapsychologist Elise Rainier as she investigates a haunting in her childhood home.

Talks for a fourth installment in the franchise began in June 2015, with Whannell saying the next film would take place shortly before the first film. In May 2016, it was announced that Chapter 4 would have an October 2017 release date with Whannell writing, Blum, Peli and Wan producing, Robitel directing, and Shaye returning to reprise her role as Elise Rainier. Principal photography began in August 2016, and ended the following month.

The film was released in the United States on January 5, 2018 by Universal Pictures. It grossed $167 million worldwide, the highest of the franchise, and received mixed reviews, with praise for Shaye's performance but some critics stating that the franchise had run its course. Insidious: Fear the Dark is scheduled to be released in 2023, to continue the storyline of the first two films.

Plot
In 1953, Elise Rainier lives in Five Keys, New Mexico with her parents Audrey and Gerald and younger brother Christian. Elise and Christian encounter a ghost in their bedroom. Frightened, Christian looks for a whistle their mother gave him to call for help, but cannot find it. Gerald, furious, canes Elise and locks her in the basement. Elise opens a mysterious red doorway and is briefly possessed by a demonic spirit. Audrey is killed by the demon.

Decades later in California in 2010, Elise works as a paranormal investigator with her colleagues Specs and Tucker. A man named Ted Garza calls, saying he's been experiencing paranormal activity at his house. Realizing it's her childhood home, Elise departs to help him. While investigating, she finds Christian's lost whistle, but it disappears again after she encounters a female spirit. Elise tells Specs and Tucker that she had seen the spirit before when she was a young girl. She had fled the house in fear of another beating from her father, abandoning Christian.

Elise, Tucker, and Specs meet Melissa and Imogen, Christian's daughters. Christian is still furious at Elise for abandoning him. Hoping to repair their relationship, Elise hands Melissa a photo of the whistle, telling her to show it to Christian. Elise and Tucker discover a hidden room in the basement. Guided by the female spirit, they discover a young woman being held prisoner inside. Ted reveals that he is responsible. He locks the group in and tries to kill Specs. Specs kills Ted in self defense.

After police clear the house, Christian and his daughters go inside to find the whistle. Melissa is attacked by the demon from Elise's past, known as "Key Face." Key Face sends her into a coma, with her consciousness now stuck in the spirit realm of "The Further."

Trying to save Melissa, Elise searches the house and discovers hidden suitcases containing belongings of numerous other women who had been held prisoner, including the young woman she had seen as a girl. Elise realizes that like Ted, her father Gerald had also kidnapped women and held them in the secret room. The woman she saw as a girl, Anna, was actually alive then, not a ghost; she was later killed by Gerald. In the present, Elise is ambushed by Key Face and her spirit taken into the Further.

Imogen, who possesses abilities like Elise's, enters The Further and is led by Anna's ghost into a prison realm where Key Face is holding all of the souls he has taken, including Melissa and Elise. Elise realizes Key Face had been controlling both Gerald and Ted, and feeds on the fear and hatred generated by the women they kidnapped. Key Face tries to coerce Elise into hurting her father's spirit as revenge for what he's done. Elise starts beating Gerald, but is stopped by Imogen and refuses to feed Key Face any more hatred. Key Face attacks Elise, but Gerald saves her before he is stabbed by Key Face, his spirit vanishing.

Key Face stabs Melissa, causing her physical body to start dying. He attempts to possess Elise. Elise blows Christian's whistle, and Audrey's spirit arrives, vanquishing Key Face. They open a door and see a young boy, Dalton Lambert. Realizing they opened the wrong door, they leave the door open and find Melissa. Melissa's spirit returns to her body in the real world, saving her life. Elise makes amends with her mother's spirit and she and Imogen return to the real world and reunite with Christian. Christian forgives Elise.

In her sleep, Elise has a dream about Dalton and a red-faced demon. She awakens and receives a call from Lorraine. Elise had helped her son years earlier, and now her grandson Dalton needs the same help, which Elise agrees to provide.

Cast 
* Lin Shaye as Elise Rainier
 Ava Kolker as young Elise Rainier
 Hana Hayes as teenage Elise Rainier
 Angus Sampson as Tucker
 Leigh Whannell as Specs
 Spencer Locke as Melissa Rainier
 Caitlin Gerard as Imogen Rainier
 Bruce Davison as Christian Rainier.
 Pierce Pope as young Christian Rainier
 Thomas Robie as teenage Christian Rainier
 Kirk Acevedo as Ted Garza
 Josh Stewart as Gerald Rainier
 Tessa Ferrer as Audrey Rainier
 Aleque Reid as Anna
 Marcus Henderson as Detective Whitfield
 Amanda Jaros as Mara Jennings
 Javier Botet as KeyFace
 Joseph Bishara as Lipstick-Face Demon

Production

Development
Prior to the release of Insidious: Chapter 3, Leigh Whannell was asked,  Whannell replied, 

On May 16, 2016, it was announced that Chapter 4 would have an October 20, 2017, release date with Whannell writing, Jason Blum, Oren Peli and James Wan producing, Adam Robitel directing, and Lin Shaye returning to reprise her role as Elise Rainier.

Filming
Principal photography began in August 2016, and ended the following month.

Release
Insidious: The Last Key was released on January 5, 2018. The film was then released a week later on January 12, 2018, in the United Kingdom.

Marketing
On August 29, 2017, it was announced via Universal Studios' Halloween Horror Nights that the film would be titled Insidious: The Last Key. In October 2017, the first poster and two trailer were divulged via Universal and Sony Pictures Entertainment. The variant poster art for social media promotion was designed by American Artist Justin Paul.

Box office
Insidious: The Last Key grossed $67.6 million in the United States and Canada, and $100.1 million in other territories, for a worldwide total of $167.9 million, against a production budget of $10 million. It is the highest grossing film in the franchise, surpassing the second installment's $161 million, and the first film of the series to gross $100 million overseas.

In the United States and Canada, Insidious: The Last Key was released alongside the wide expansion of Molly's Game, and was projected to gross $20–22 million from 3,116 theaters in its opening weekend. The film made $1.98 grossed from Thursday night previews, the highest preview total of the franchise. It went on to debut to $29.3 million for the weekend, finishing second at the box office behind holdover Jumanji: Welcome to the Jungle and marking the second-highest opening of the series and grossing, behind Chapter 2.

Critical response
The website's critical consensus reads, "Insidious: The Last Key offers franchise star Lin Shaye another welcome opportunity to take the lead, but her efforts aren't enough to rescue this uninspired sequel." On Metacritic, the film has a weighted average score of 49 out of 100, based on 23 critics, indicating "mixed or average reviews". Audiences polled by CinemaScore gave the film an average grade of "B−" on an A+ to F scale, the lowest score of the franchise.

Screen Rant'''s Sandy Schaefer scored the film 3/5 stars, stating "Insidious: The Last Key is a solid finale to the Insidious franchise that gives series lead Lin Shaye the chance to take a graceful final bow." Brent McKnight of the Seattle Times rated the film two stars, saying "Old horror franchises don't die, they unspool tepid, uninspired sequels in perpetuity. And with the fourth chapter, Insidious: The Last Key, this saga is on a familiar path." Emily Yoshida of New York Magazine noted how "the fourth installment of Leigh Whannell's ghost-and-mediums horror series wraps up its own free-association illogic with an impenetrable tangle of woo-woo spirit-world mechanics and lingo", while John DeFore of Hollywood Reporter faulted the film's delivery of "the boos" as remaining "cheap and arbitrary."

Home mediaInsidious: The Last Key'' was released on Digital HD on March 20, 2018 and was released on DVD and Blu-ray on April 3, 2018, by Sony Pictures Home Entertainment.

Sequel

On October 29, 2020, it was announced that a sequel was in the works with Scott Teems writing the screenplay based on a story by Leigh Whannell and series star Patrick Wilson directing. It will focus on a grown-up Dalton, a role reprised by series star Ty Simpkins, as he heads off to college. It is set for July 7, 2023.

References

External links
 
 
  
   
 

2018 films
2018 horror films
2018 horror thriller films
2010s ghost films
2010s supernatural horror films
American ghost films
American haunted house films
American horror thriller films
American supernatural horror films
Demons in film
Films about spirit possession
Films produced by Jason Blum
Films produced by James Wan
Films scored by Joseph Bishara
Films set in 1953
Films set in 2010
Films set in New Mexico
Films shot in Los Angeles County, California
Films with screenplays by Leigh Whannell
Interquel films
4
Stage 6 Films films
Blumhouse Productions films
Universal Pictures films
2010s English-language films
2010s American films
American prequel films